The 2022 NCAA Division I Men's Lacrosse Championship was the 51st annual single-elimination tournament to determine the national championship for National Collegiate Athletic Association (NCAA) Division I men's college lacrosse.

Eighteen teams competed in the tournament based upon their performance during the regular season. For ten teams, entry into the tournament was by means of a conference tournament automatic qualifier, while for the remaining eight teams at-large selection was determined by the NCAA selection committee.

After losing in the championship game the year prior, Maryland won their fourth NCAA-era national championship, capping off an undefeated season. In the national championship game against Cornell, the Terrapins led 9–2 in the latter stages of the third quarter before Cornell closed the game on a five-goal run. Maryland goalkeeper Logan McNaney made 17 saves.

Teams

Bracket

*=denotes overtime

Tournament boxscores

Tournament Finals   (5/30/2022 at East Hartford, Conn. Pratt & Whitney Stadium)

Tournament Semi-Finals   (5/28/2022 at East Hartford, Conn. Pratt & Whitney Stadium)

Tournament Quarterfinals

Tournament First Round

Score 1 2 3 4 Total
Vermont 1 1 1 2 5

Vermont Goals: James Basile (1); David Closterman (1); Brock Haley (1); Liam Limoges (1); Michael McCormack (1)
Assists: David Closterman (1); Thomas McConvey (1)
Maryland Goals: Logan Wisnauskas (4); Anthony DeMaio (3); Owen Murphy (3); Keegan Khan (2); Jack Koras (2); Jonathan Donville (1); Eric
Malever (1); Gabe Goforth (1); Ajax Zappitello (1); Ryan Siracusa (1); Jack Brennan (1); Daniel Kelly (1)
Assists: Keegan Khan (3); Logan Wisnauskas (2); Anthony DeMaio (2); Daniel Maltz (2); Jack Brennan (2); Bubba Fairman (1); Kyle Long
Goalkeepers Minutes GA Saves Dec
30 Logan McNaney 45:00 3 11 W
18 Drew Morris 15:00 2 6
(1); Luke Wierman (1); Owen Murphy (1)
Shots 1 2 3 4 Total
Vermont 7 11 9 10 37
Maryland 8 18 15 5 46
Goalkeepers Minutes GA Saves Dec
14 Ryan Cornell 57:24 20 12 L
66 Matt Shaffer 2:36 1 0

NCAA Division I Men's Lacrosse Championship
2022 in American sports
2022 NCAA Division I men's lacrosse season
NCAA Division I Men's Lacrosse Championship